Fasciolaria tulipa, common name the true tulip, is a species of large sea snail, a marine gastropod mollusk in the family Fasciolariidae.

Distribution
This species occurs from the North Carolina coast all the way south and west to the Gulf coast of Texas, also in the West Indies and Brazil.

Shell description
The tulip shell has a fusiform outline, with an overall smooth surface, and presents fine growth lines, and small denticles on the inner edge of its delicate outer lip. It is whitish to tan in color, with rows of darker brownish blotches of various sizes. Over the blotches are symmetrical rows of thin lines which spiral along the whorls of the shell, which are normally about 9 in number.

The shell of an adult tulip snail can be from 2.5” to 9.5” inches (6.4 – 24.1 cm) in length.

Gallery

Habitat
Fasciolaria tulipa usually lives in sand flats and seagrass beds, especially where the turtle grass (scientific name Thalassia testudinum) is present, at depths of nearly 30 feet.

Feeding habits
This snail eats bivalves and various other gastropods including the banded tulip Fasciolaria lilium, and the queen conch Eustrombus gigas.

References

External links 

 
 Florent's Guide To The Florida, Bahamas & Caribbean Reefs
 A juvenile shell of F. tulipa

Fasciolariidae
Gastropods described in 1758
Taxa named by Carl Linnaeus